SS Brazil may refer to:

 , completed in 1905 as RMS Virginia, renamed Drottningholm in 1920 and Brasil in 1948.
 , completed in 1928 as SS Virginia, and refitted and renamed as Brazil in 1938.
 , launched in 1957 by Ingalls Shipbuilding. Had numerous later names.
Some ships are spelled with an "s" to match Portuguese spelling of the nation of Brazil.

Ship names